Teodor Vasile (born 16 August 1947) is a retired Romanian cyclist. He competed at the 1972 and 1980 Summer Olympics in the individual road race and finished in 60th place in 1972. He won one stage of the Peace Race in 1977.

1975 war er rumänischer Landesmeister im Straßenrennen.

References 

1947 births
Living people
Olympic cyclists of Romania
Cyclists at the 1972 Summer Olympics
Cyclists at the 1980 Summer Olympics
Romanian male cyclists